Mount Sandel may refer to:

Mount Sandel Fort, a fort in Coleraine, County Londonderry, Northern Ireland
Mount Sandel Mesolithic site, excavated mesolithic huts in Coleraine, County Londonderry, Northern Ireland
Mount Sandel, County Londonderry, a townland in County Londonderry, Northern Ireland